Hop latent virus (HpLV) is a plant pathogenic virus. It infects hop cones which is a flavoring agent in beer. Recently, it has also become a concern in Cannabis cultivation.

External links
ICTVdB - The Universal Virus Database: Hop latent virus
Family Groups - The Baltimore Method

Carlaviruses
Viral plant pathogens and diseases
Hop diseases